Okano is the tenth studio album by Zdravko Čolić, released in 2000. The album sold more than 500,000 copies. The title track, 'Okano', was declared the hit of the year.

Track listing

 Okano (Pretty Eyes)
 Mjerkam te, mjerkam (I'm Looking You Over)
 'Ajde, idi (Come On, Go) (M. Badan)
 U boji vina (In The Color Of Wine)
 Hotel Balkan
 Noć mi te duguje (The Night Owes You To Me)
 Stavi prst na čelo (Put A Finger On Your Forehead)
 Idem da odmorim (I'm Going To Rest)
 Krasiva (Beautiful) (V. Meladze)
 Na adresi ti piše... (Your Address Says...)
 Kuba (Cuba)
 Šta radiš tu (What Are You Doing There) (A. Dedić)

References

2000 albums
Zdravko Čolić albums